"Life" is a pop rock song written by Ana Johnsson, Jörgen Elofsson, Mathias Venge, and Pontus Wennerberg and recorded by the pop rock singer Ana Johnsson (as Ana). It was released as the second single in Swedish released from her (officially) first studio album Cuz I Can, which was only released in Sweden.

Track listings
Download single
"Life" [album version] – 3:08

CD single
"Life" – 3:08
"Life" [instrumental] – 3:08

Chart performance

Curious
"Life" was supposed to be the track on the Spider-Man 2 (soundtrack) instead of We Are (that was later created).
When Ana was approached by the head of Columbia Tristar the first thought was that "Life" would be the track, and to be only released on the Swedish, German and Swiss versions of the soundtrack.
But later We Are was created and ended up to be the track featured on the worldwide Spider-Man 2 (soundtrack)

Ana Johnsson songs
2004 singles
Songs written by Jörgen Elofsson
Songs written by Pontus Winnberg
2004 songs
Articles containing video clips